Consider the Cost is a contemporary Christian music album by Steve Camp and was released by Sparrow Records in 1991. This was Camp's first album of new material since 1989's Justice and also featured a less-rock oriented sound than most of his previous releases on Sparrow.

Track listing 
All songs written by Steve Camp, except where noted.
 "The Cross Is a Radical Thing" – 4:23
 "For Every Time" (S. Camp, Kim Maxfield-Camp, Rob Frazier, Steven Curtis Chapman) – 4:19
 "Carry Me" (S. Camp, Maxfield-Camp, Frazier) – 4:07
 "Shade for the Children" – 5:28
 "Consider the Cost" – 5:51
 "Follow Me" – 3:26
 "Could I Be Called a Christian" – 5:33
 "The Agony of Deceit" – 5:27
 "Guard the Trust" – 4:19
 "All That I Need" (S. Camp, Maxfield-Camp, Frazier, Kemper Crabb) – 4:30

Personnel 

 Steve Camp – lead and backing vocals, pianos, track arrangements
 Phil Naish – pianos, synthesizers, track arrangements
 Dan Lee – guitars
 Leland Sklar – bass
 Paul Leim – drums
 Terry McMillan – percussion
 Chris McDonald – trombone, horn arrangements
 Barry Green – trombone
 Mike Haynes – trumpet
 George Tidwell – trumpet
 Paul Buckmaster – string arrangements and conductor
 Carl Gorodetzky and The Nashville String Machine – strings
 Mark Heimermann – backing vocals
 Chris Rodriguez – backing vocals
 Lisa Bevill – backing vocals (9)
 Ashley Cleveland – backing vocals (9)
 Vicki Hampton – backing vocals (9)

Production

 Phil Naish – producer
 Wendy Holt – production coordination
 Ronnie Brookshire – engineer
 Bill Schnee – mixing 
 Quad Studios, Nashville, Tennessee – recording location
 Javelina Recording Studios, Nashville, Tennessee – recording location
 Treasure Isle Recording, Nashville, Tennessee – recording location
 Classic Recording, Franklin, Tennessee – recording location
 North Beach Studio, Franklin, Tennessee – recording location
 Morningstar Sound Recording, Hendersonville, Tennessee – recording location
 Doug Sax – mastering at The Mastering Lab, Los Angeles, California
 Heather Horne – art direction and design
 Mark Tucker – photography
 Nancy Nimoy – illustrations

References 

1991 albums
Steve Camp albums
Sparrow Records albums